Fieldon Township is a township in Watonwan County, Minnesota, United States. The population was 246 at the 2000 census.

History
Fieldon Township was organized in 1868.

Geography

Demographics
As of the census of 2000, there were 246 people, 84 households, and 68 families residing in the township. The population density was 6.9 people per square mile (2.7/km2). There were 96 housing units at an average density of 2.7/sq mi (1.0/km2). The racial makeup of the township was 97.97% White, 0.41% Native American, and 1.63% from two or more races.

There were 84 households, out of which 42.9% had children under the age of 18 living with them, 71.4% were married couples living together, 3.6% had a female householder with no husband present, and 19.0% were non-families. 10.7% of all households were made up of individuals, and 3.6% had someone living alone who was 65 years of age or older. The average household size was 2.93 and the average family size was 3.15.

In the township the population was spread out, with 30.9% under the age of 18, 5.7% from 18 to 24, 28.5% from 25 to 44, 23.6% from 45 to 64, and 11.4% who were 65 years of age or older. The median age was 34 years. For every 100 females, there were 105.0 males. For every 100 females age 18 and over, there were 100.0 males.

The median income for a household in the township was $54,167, and the median income for a family was $56,000. Males had a median income of $31,000 versus $28,281 for females. The per capita income for the township was $19,001. About 9.5% of families and 9.7% of the population were below the poverty line, including 15.5% of those under the age of eighteen and none of those 65 or over.

References

Townships in Watonwan County, Minnesota
Townships in Minnesota